The following lists events in 2020 in Georgia.

Incumbents

National
President: Salome Zourabichvili (since 2018)
Prime Minister: Giorgi Gakharia (since 2019)
Chairperson of Parliament: Archil Talakvadze (since 2019)

Autonomous republics

Adjara
Chairman of the Government: Tornike Rizhvadze (since 2018)
Chairman of the Supreme Council: Davit Gabaidze (since 2016)

Abkhazia
Chairman of Government (-in-exile): Ruslan Abashidze (since 2019)
Chairman of the Supreme Council (-in-exile): Jemal Gamakharia (since 2019)

Disputed territories

Abkhazia
President: Raul Khadjimba (until 13 January), Valeri Bganba (acting, from 13 January)
Prime Minister: Valeri Bganba (since 2018)
Chairman of People's Assembly: Valeri Kvarchia (since 2017)

South Ossetia
President: Anatoly Bibilov (since 2017)
Prime Minister: Erik Pukhayev (since 2017)
Chairman of Parliament: Pyotr Gasiev (since 2017)

Events

January 
 7 January – A high-ranking police official pleads guilty to beating and killing a 24-year-old man on 2 January in Tbilisi, one of a series of recent major incidents of police excesses in Georgia.
 9 January – The government of Georgia terminates its contract with the Anaklia Development Consortium on the construction of a deep sea port at Anaklia on account of the consortium's failure to provide adequate financial guarantees and to find "a real" investor. The consortium's leadership says they will take the case to an international court, while the opposition and government critics allege the ruling Georgian Dream party's leader Bidzina Ivanishvili's personal interest in suppressing the project.
 13 January – Raul Khajimba, de facto president of breakaway Abkhazia, resigns after the opposition supporters storm the government office on 9 January and a supreme court annuls the results of the September 2019 presidential election runoff on 10 January 2020.

Scheduled events 
 22 March – 2020 Abkhazian presidential election.
 14 – 15 May – As the rotating presidency of the Council of Europe, Georgia will host the 130th meeting of the Committee of Ministers of the Council of Europe in Tbilisi. Whether the Russian Foreign Minister Sergey Lavrov will be allowed in the country within the framework of the upcoming ministerial is unclear.
 31 October – 2020 Georgian parliamentary election.

Deaths 
 5 January – Anri Jergenia, former head of the Abkhaz separatist government (b. 1941).
 21 January – Tengiz Sigua, former Prime Minister (b. 1934).

References 

 
Georgia
Georgia
2020s in Georgia (country)
Years of the 21st century in Georgia (country)
Georgia